Presidential elections were held in Senegal on 21 February 1993. Incumbent President Abdou Diouf of the Socialist Party defeated seven other candidates, winning 58.4% of the vote. Voter turnout was 51.5%.

Results

References

Further reading

Senegal
Presidential elections in Senegal
1993 in Senegal
February 1993 events in Africa